The Daily Jolt (2000–2010) was a large and robust network of online campus-specific community and news sites. It was founded by Amit Gupta, Noah Winer, and Seth Fitzsimmons at Amherst College. A site for Brown University was started by Mike Goelzer shortly thereafter, both which remained the most active school portals in the system during the decade it remained in business.  At its peak, there were sites for more than 100 college campuses in the United States and Canada. The Daily Jolt was run by student volunteers at each school, known as "Jolters", and supported by a small staff located in Boston, Massachusetts.

When the founders left the growth and operations of The Daily Jolt went to Christopher Herron supported by Ron Ayers and Kendra Grimes. Mark Miller  took the reins from Herron, serving as Executive Chairman. He re-capitalized the company and acquired CollegiateLink, which was founded by Aaron Severs and Mark Greene. Miller oversaw the growth of the two assets of what become known as NewDJ Corp. The Daily Jolt was sold to Chungdahm Learning and a year later after investing in the growth of CollegiateLink it was sold with a strong return on capital to Campus Labs which in turn sold to Higher One and then to Leeds Equity Partners.

Features of The Daily Jolt included The Love Monkey, a matchmaker system using blind mutual interest, cross-campus (multi-school) and school-specific forums, local and national job boards, and Yarn, a choose your own adventure web story writing system.

List of campuses (incomplete) 
 Amherst College
 Bard College at Simon's Rock
 Brown University
 Clarkson University
 The College of New Jersey
 Hampshire College
 Harvard University
 Johns Hopkins University
 Johnson & Wales University
 Millsaps College
 Mount Holyoke College
 Pacific Lutheran University
 Pennsylvania State University
 Texas A&M University
 Truman State University
 University of Massachusetts Amherst
 Smith College
 Xavier University of Louisiana
 Swarthmore College
 University of Rochester

References

American student news websites
Defunct social networking services
Defunct clubs and societies of the United States
Defunct non-profit organizations based in the United States
Defunct American websites